is a railway station in the city of Kurobe, Toyama, Japan, operated by the private railway operator Toyama Chihō Railway.

Lines

Station layout 
The station has two opposed ground-level side platforms serving two tracks connected by a level crossing. The station is unattended.

Platforms

History
Dentetsu-Ishida Station was opened on 1 June 1940.

Adjacent stations

Passenger statistics
In fiscal 2015, the station was used by 262 passengers daily.

Surrounding area 
Ishida Post Office
Ishida Elementary School

See also
 List of railway stations in Japan

References

External links

 

Railway stations in Toyama Prefecture
Railway stations in Japan opened in 1940
Stations of Toyama Chihō Railway
Kurobe, Toyama